Broken Arrow War : Book 1, The Beginning is the first book in a series called Broken Arrow War. It is set in a world of lycans and vampires, filled with magic, and violence.

Plot 
The plot centres around a family of three: Brenat, Teera, and their son, Joel. Who belong to a race thought to have been destroyed. Brenat and Teera believe they will never have children. So when a miracle happens during their bonding on the night of the Blood Moon, they are both extremely happy. However, the baby is sought after by the witch Keres and her master due to their belief that the family are the ones from an ancient legend of creation, meaning the baby could be used to take over the world.

About the authors
Teresa Sewell started writing while in her teens; she apprenticed under the noted photojournalist, Bud Lee, of Ybor City, Florida, which sparked her interest in journalism. Later she started her own newspaper, that was both in print and online, which had a million readers worldwide. Once retired she returned to her first love of writing with her partner Rob LE. Together they wrote the first in the Broken Arrow War series. Teresa's zodiac sign is Capricorn (astrology), and her Chinese sign is the Tiger (zodiac).

Rob LE's zodiac sign is Aries (astrology), and his Chinese sign is the Rat (zodiac). He likes fishing, woodworking, RPGs, reading, and stargazing. Rob is the father of two and a dog lover. He was born and raised in Sask, Canada.

Together they live in Sask, Canada, where they continue to write. They own a rescued Stafford Terrier named Buddy, as well as a male Betta fish named Bob and a snail named Creepy.

References

2016 Canadian novels
Paranormal romance novel series
Canadian romance novels